Gorica pri Raztezu is a settlement west of Brestanica in the Municipality of Krško in eastern Slovenia. The area is part of the traditional region of Styria. It is now included in the Lower Sava Statistical Region.

The local church is dedicated to the Holy Spirit and belongs to the Parish of Brestanica. It is essentially a medieval church with a rectangular nave that was restyled in the Baroque style in the late 18th century.

Name
The name of the settlement was changed from Gorica to Gorica pri Raztezu in 1953.

References

External links
Gorica pri Raztezu on Geopedia

Populated places in the Municipality of Krško